Winster Market House is a building dating from the end of the 17th or beginning of the 18th centuries, and is situated in Winster, near Matlock, Derbyshire, England. The house has been in the ownership of the National Trust since 1906. It was the Trust's first acquisition in the Peak District.

Winster Market House dates back to the time when cheese and cattle fairs featured prominently in the daily life of the area.

External links

 Winster Market House information at the National Trust

National Trust properties in Derbyshire
Tourist attractions in Derbyshire
Winster